Hayle Ibrahimov ( – Haile Desta Hagos; born 18 January 1990) is an Ethiopian-born Azerbaijani international middle and long distance track and field athlete, mainly competing in the disciplines of 3000 metres and 5000 metres. He holds the Azerbaijani records in both these events.

Ibrahimov was the winner of the 3000 m at the European Athletics Indoor Championships in 2013, having been the silver medallist two years earlier. His bronze in the 5000 m 2010 European Athletics Championships was Azerbaijan's first medal in the history of that tournament. He represented his country at the 2012 London Olympics.

Biography
He was born in Mek'ele in Ethiopia's Tigray Region. As a teenager he completed a transfer of allegiance to compete for Azerbaijan from 2009 onwards. In his first year for his new country he set Azerbaijani records in the 3000 metres (7:51.68 min) and the 5000 metres (13:53.60 min), as well as national junior records in events from 1500 m to 10,000 m. Ibrahimov secured his first national title over 5000 m and took a 5000 and 10,000 m gold medal double at the 2009 European Athletics Junior Championships.  He was a nominee in the men's European Athletics Rising Star of the Year Award for his achievements in 2009.

At the 2010 IAAF World Indoor Championships he ran in the heats and although he was eliminated in the 3000 m heats he managed a national indoor record of 8:05.43 minutes. On 31 July 2010, he became Azerbaijan's first ever medallist in the athletics by winning bronze at 2010 European Athletics Championships in Barcelona. He ran an Azerbaijani indoor record in the 3000 metres at the BW-Bank Meeting in February 2011, setting a time of 7:42.54 minutes.

On 5 March 2011, he won silver in the 3000 metres at the European Indoor Championships, narrowly losing to Mo Farah. He was the favourite entering the 5000 m at the 2011 European Athletics U23 Championships, but failed to finish the event due to an injury that ruled him out for most of the season. He ran in the heats of the event at the 2012 IAAF World Indoor Championships, but did not progress to the final. Later that year he ran in the 5000 m at 2012 European Athletics Championships (where he came sixth) and at the 2012 London Olympics, managing ninth place. At September's Palio Citta della Quercia he ran a meet record and Azerbaijani best of 13:11.34 minutes for the 5000 m. He also came eighth in the under-23 section of the 2012 European Cross Country Championships that year.

At the start of 2013 he improved his indoor national record three times, culminating in a run of 7:39.59 minutes at the XL Galan. On 2 March 2013, he won gold in the 3000 metres at the European Indoor Championships. Another national record came at the Doha Diamond League meeting in May, where he ran 7:34.57 minutes for the 3000 metres.  In 2013 he won the gold medal at the Universiade, with a new Games record, a title he defended in 2015.

He won the silver medal in the 5000 m at the 2014 European Championships.  In 2016, he again represented Azerbaijan at the Olympics.

Personal bests

References

External links
 

1990 births
Living people
Azerbaijani male long-distance runners
Ethiopian male long-distance runners
People from Mekelle
Athletes (track and field) at the 2012 Summer Olympics
Athletes (track and field) at the 2016 Summer Olympics
Olympic athletes of Azerbaijan
European Athletics Championships medalists
World Athletics Championships athletes for Azerbaijan
European Games competitors for Azerbaijan
Athletes (track and field) at the 2015 European Games
Naturalized citizens of Azerbaijan
Universiade medalists in athletics (track and field)
Universiade gold medalists for Azerbaijan
Sportspeople from Tigray Region
Azerbaijani male cross country runners
Ethiopian emigrants
Ethiopian emigrants to Azerbaijan
Medalists at the 2013 Summer Universiade
Medalists at the 2015 Summer Universiade
Azerbaijani people of Ethiopian descent